Jun or JUN may refer to:

People and anthroponymy
 Jun (given name), a common Japanese given name
 Jun (singer), a member of South Korean boy band U-KISS
 Tomáš Jun, Czech footballer
 A spelling of common Korean family name Jeon (Korean surname)
 A spelling of uncommon Korean family and given name Joon (Korean name)
 Jun., Jr. or Jnr., abbreviations for Junior (disambiguation)
 Jun, stage name of Chinese singer Wen Junhui

Places
 Jun, Granada, Spain

Science
 c-jun, a protein encoded by gene JUN

Time
 Abbreviation of June
 A ten-day period in the Japanese calendar

History
 Commandery (China) (jùn in pinyin), a division of imperial China

Other
 Jun (drink), a Tibetan fermented tea drink
 JUN Auto, a Japanese car tuning shop